Incheh-ye Khoda Bandehlu (also Romanized as Īncheh-ye Khodā Bandehlū; also known as Aincha and Īncheh) is a village in Khararud Rural District, in the Central District of Khodabandeh County, Zanjan Province, Iran. At the 2006 census, its population was 1,526, in 365 families.

References 

Populated places in Khodabandeh County